Egypt Central is the debut album by the rock music group Egypt Central. The album was recorded while the band was signed to Lava Records, only to get dropped before the album was released. Due to the overwhelming number of people wanting the album, the band self-released it on April 26, 2005. The album was made available online through CD Baby and briefly through Amazon.com, as well as music stores throughout the Memphis area. The band signed a record deal in April, 2006 with Bieler Bros. Records, with the intention of releasing the same album. However, the band parted ways with the label in late July. The album was set for release on August 22.

On October 5, 2007, the band officially signed a record deal with Fat Lady Music/ILG distributed by ADA. The original CD has been remixed and remastered with new artwork and was released to retailers nationwide on January 15, 2008 featuring their new single "You Make Me Sick". The entire recording is now available on iTunes. Both "You Make Me Sick" and "Taking You Down" were featured on the video game WWE SmackDown vs. Raw 2009. "Taking You Down" was featured on the soundtrack to The Cave, but not in the movie itself, and "Over and Under" was featured in the movie The Condemned.

Track listing

Bonus online pre-order track

Personnel

Blake "Black" Allison – drums, vocals
Joey Chicago – bass guitar, vocals
John Falls – lead vocals
Heath Hindman – guitar
Stephen Williams – guitar, vocals (Performed On Debut Album)
Paul David Hager – mixing
Josh Abraham – producer, mixing, audio production
Louis Levin – executive producer
George Marino – mastering
Pete Matthews – mixing
Ryan Williams – engineer, audio engineer

2008 debut albums
Self-released albums
Lava Records albums
Bieler Bros. Records albums
Albums produced by Josh Abraham
Egypt Central albums